Statue of Mary McLeod Bethune may refer to:

 Mary McLeod Bethune Memorial
 Statue of Mary McLeod Bethune (Jersey City, New Jersey)
 Statue of Mary McLeod Bethune (U.S. Capitol)